Gabé Hirschowitz is an Australian-American art dealer, philanthropist, and lifestyle journalist.

Personal life 
Born in Sydney, Australia, Hirschowitz was raised in Los Angeles, California. She was educated at Brentwood School (Los Angeles) and later attended USC Annenberg School for Communication and Journalism where she attained a B.A. in Communications with a minor in Psychology in 2008.

During her time at University, Hirschowitz undertook internships with several journalistic publications, including editorial positions at Teen Vogue and Vogue Italia, and subsequently worked for notable fashion houses Carolina Herrera and Nina Ricci. Following this, Hirschowitz moved to New York City, though she would continue to split her time between New York and Los Angeles following the move.

Foundation/Philanthropic work and writing 
After college, Hirschowitz was employed at the Museum of Contemporary Art, Los Angeles. Concurrently, she collaborated with UNICEF, taking on the role of Steering Committee Member of UNICEF Next Generation Los Angeles from 2014 to 2020. During this time, she headed several charity initiatives, co-founding the Vista Del Mar Young Leadership Committee in LA in 2014 and The UNICEF Next Generation Art Party in 2017.

During this time, Hirschowitz also began occasionally writing for various online and print arts and culture publications, including MyDomaine.com, C Magazine, LA Confidential, eventually also contributing to Artnet and Vogue.

Galerie Perrie and the Digital Art Space 
Hirschowitz has achieved prominence in the international art world, receiving attention in the art and fashion press from the likes of ArtNet and Vogue--as well as from numerous others--for founding one of the Internet's first traditionally curated online art galleries, Galerie Perrie, in 2021.

The impetus for Galerie Perrie's founding came as a result of the 2019-2022 COVID-19 pandemic after Hirschowitz had spent nearly a decade working as a private art consultant and art buyer, in addition to taking on numerous leadership roles in art philanthropy.

In a 2022 interview with her, ArtNet Vice President Sophie Neuendorf named Hirschowitz "one of the contemporary art world’s most plugged-in young consultants" who has "set a new standard in the art-collecting world."

Awards
Hirschowitz was awarded the President's Volunteer Service Award by Barack Obama in 2016 for her efforts supporting UNICEF Tap Project.

References

Year of birth missing (living people)
Living people
21st-century Australian women artists
21st-century American women artists
21st-century Australian women writers
21st-century American women writers
Writers from Sydney
Writers from Los Angeles
UNICEF people